A bottle is a narrow-necked container made of an impermeable material. 

Bottle or Bottles may also refer to:

Films
 The Bottle (1915 film), a British silent drama film
 Bottles (film), a 1936 animated cartoon
 The Bottle (2000 film), a Canadian comedy-drama film

Music
 The Bottles, a 1970s pop duo
 "The Bottle", a song by American soul artist Gil Scott-Heron and musician Brian Jackson
 "Bottle", a song on the album DAAS Icon by the Doug Anthony All Stars

Places
 Bottle Beach State Park, a state park in Washington state, United States
 Bottle Hill, a former place in New Jersey, now part of Madison, New Jersey
 Bottle Hill, a community in Mishkeegogamang First Nation, Ontario, Canada
 Bottle Hollow, Tennessee, an unincorporated community in Bedford County, Tennessee
 Bottle Island, an island in Scotland
 Bottle Mountain, a mountain in New York state
 Hat Khuat ("Bottle Beach"), a beach in Thailand
 The Bottle, Alabama, community in Auburn, Alabama, United States
 Bottle Lake (disambiguation), any of a number of lakes

Other uses
 Baby bottle, a bottle used to feed infants and sometimes referred to simply as a "bottle"
 The Bottle (etchings), 1847 series of etchings by George Cruikshank

See also
 Bottle rocket (disambiguation)
 Bottle tree (disambiguation)
 Bottlebrush (disambiguation)
 Bottleneck (disambiguation)
 Bottlenose (disambiguation)
 Bottler (disambiguation)
 Bottletop (disambiguation)